The FIA WTCC Race of Thailand was a round of the World Touring Car Championship held at the Chang International Circuit located in Buriram, Isan, Thailand.

The race made its debut in the World Touring Car Championship as the 11th round of the 2015 World Touring Car Championship season. The race was cancelled in 2016.

Winners

References

Thailand
Race of Thailand